Pierre Guyotat (9 January 1940 – 7 February 2020) was a French writer.

Early life
Pierre Guyotat was born on 9 January 1940 in Bourg-Argental, Loire.

Literary career

1960s–1970s
Guyotat wrote his first novel, Sur un cheval, in 1960.  He was called to Algeria in the same year to fight in the Algerian War.

In 1962 he was found guilty of desertion and publishing forbidden material.  After three months in jail he was transferred to a disciplinary centre.  Back in Paris, he got involved in journalism, writing first for France Observateur, then for Nouvel Observateur.  In 1964, Guyotat published his second novel Ashby.

Between 1964 and 1975, Guyotat travelled extensively in the Sahara. In July 1967, he was invited to Cuba, along with other writers, where he travelled to the Sierra Maestra with Fidel Castro.

In 1967, he published Tombeau pour cinq cent mille soldats (later released in English as Tomb for 500,000 Soldiers). Based on his ordeal as a soldier in the Algerian War, the book earned a cult reputation and became the subject of various controversies, mostly because of its omnipresent sexual obsessions and homoeroticism.

In 1968, Guyotat became a member of the French Communist Party, which he left in 1971.

Eden, Eden, Eden was published in 1970 with a preface by Michel Leiris, Roland Barthes, and Philippe Sollers (Michel Foucault's text was received late and therefore did not appear). This book was banned from being publicised or sold to minors. A petition of international support was signed by Pier Paolo Pasolini, Jean-Paul Sartre, Pierre Boulez, Joseph Beuys, Pierre Dac, Jean Genet, Simone de Beauvoir, Joseph Kessel, Maurice Blanchot, Max Ernst, Italo Calvino, Jacques Monod, and Nathalie Sarraute. François Mitterrand, and Georges Pompidou tried to get the ban lifted but failed. Claude Simon (who won the Nobel Prize in 1985) resigned from the jury of the Prix Médicis after the prize wasn't awarded to Eden, Eden, Eden.

In 1973, Guyotat's play Bond en avant ("Leap Forward") was performed. During the 1970s he was involved in various protests: for soldiers, immigrants, and prostitutes. One of those cases was of great importance for him: he personally helped Mohamed Laïd Moussa, a 24-year-old Algerian ex-teacher who was accused and then found guilty of unintentional murder in Marseilles. One week after he came out of jail, Moussa was murdered by a masked man; this event had a profound impact on Guyotat.

In 1975 his novel Prostitution came out (which incorporated Bond en avant as the final monologue). From this point on, Guyotat's novels deal with a new kind of illegibility and obscenity. They still explore the possibility of worlds structured by sexual slavery and transgression of fundamental taboos. But the French language is now unrecognisable, estranged by an extreme grammatical, syntactic and lexical creativity. Ellipses of letters or words, neologisms and phonetic transcriptions of Arabic utterances make it difficult to understand. In the 1987 re-issue of Prostitution, a 120-page appendix - résumé, glossary, "grammar" and translations - is added to the actual fiction, to help the reader.

In 1977, while working on Le Livre (1984) and Histoire de Samora Machel (still unpublished), he suffered a psychiatric illness. The depression and the deterioration of his physical and mental state culminated, in December 1981, in a coma.

1980s
Following the election of Francois Mitterrand, France's first socialist president, in 1981, the ban on Eden, Eden, Eden was lifted.

From 1984 to 1986, Guyotat gave a series of readings and performances of his work all over Europe.

2000s
In January 2000 he was involved in the reopening of the Centre Georges Pompidou at Beaubourg in Paris, contributing a reading of the first pages of Progénitures. The book was published shortly after, in 2000 (Gallimard), and Explications (éditions Leo Scheer). In 2005, Sur un cheval was reedited and in April 2005 it was read on Radio France under Alain Ollivier's direction. The Carnets de bord (vol. 1, 1962-1969) were published the same year, as well as Pierre Guyotat's first biography by Catherine Brun, Pierre Guyotat, essai biographique.

Between 2005 and 2010, Guyotat wrote and published three autobiographical books: Coma (prix Décembre 2006), Formation (2007) and Arrière-fond (2010). In 2011, he wrote Independence, about his experience of the war, published for the centenary of the Nouvelle Revue Française. The classes he gave at the University of Paris 8 between 2001 and 2004 were published in 2011 under the title Leçons sur la langue française (éd. Léo Scheer).

In 2014 he published Joyeux animaux de la misère (Gallimard). An excerpt of the book was read at the Ircam by actor and director Stanislas Nordey who brought the text to the stage in 2016. The second part of the book was published in the spring of 2016.

Recognition
In 2018, Pierre Guyotat's Idiotie won the Prix Medicis.

In September 2020, an international project entitled Eden Eden Eden at 50 was organised by scholar, writer and museum executive Donatien Grau. The event, celebrating the 50th anniversary of Guyotat's book, comprised 50 readings around the world, by a diverse group of creatives, including artists Paul McCarthy and Kaari Upson; writer Chris Kraus; and rapper  Abd al Malik. It also included a new film by Australian filmmaker Amiel Courtin-Wilson; a performance by artist  Michael Dean, a reading by Philippe Parreno in Berlin; and a concert by  Scott McCulloch in Tbilisi.

Death and legacy
In 2004, Guyotat donated his manuscripts to the Bibliothèque nationale de France (French National Library).

He died on 7 February 2020.

Bibliography

English translations
"Eden, Eden, Eden" transl. by Graham Fox, reworked and revised, (London, Vauxhall & Company, 2017, series editors Paul Buck & Catherine Petit)
"Body of the Text," transl. by Catherine Duncan, published in Polysexuality (Los Angeles, Semiotext(e), 1981).
Eden, Eden, Eden, transl. by Graham Fox (London, Creation Books, 1995). 
Prostitution: An Excerpt, transl. by Bruce Benderson (New York, Red Dust, 1995). 
Tomb for 500,000 soldiers, transl. by Romain Slocombe (London, Creation Books, 2003). 
"Art is what remains of History," transl. by Paul Buck and Catherine Petit, published in Frozen Tears II (Birmingham, ARTicle Press, 2004).
Coma, transl. by Noura Wedell (Los Angeles, Semiotext(e), 2010). 
Independence, transl. by Noura Wedell (Los Angeles, Semiotext(e), 2011).
In the deep, transl. by Noura Wedell (Los Angeles, Semiotext(e), 2014).

Fiction
1961 Sur un cheval (Seuil, Paris).
1964 Ashby (Seuil, Paris).
1967 Tombeau pour cinq cent mille soldats (Gallimard, Paris).
1970 Eden, Eden, Eden (Gallimard, Paris).
1975 Prostitution (Gallimard, Paris).
1984 Le Livre (Gallimard, Paris).
1995 Wanted Female, with Sam Francis (Lapis Press, Los Angeles).
2000 Progénitures (Gallimard, Paris).
2014 Joyeux animaux de la misère (Gallimard, Paris).
2016 Par la main dans les enfers: Joyeux animaux de la misère II (Gallimard, Paris)

Non-fiction
1972 Littérature interdite (Gallimard, Paris).
1984 Vivre (Denoël, Paris).
2000 Explications (Léo Scheer, Paris).
2005 Carnets de bord, volume 1 1962-1969 (Ligne-Manifeste).
2006 Coma (Mercure de France, Paris).
2007 Formation (Gallimard, Paris).
2010 Arrière-fond (Gallimard, Paris).
2011 Leçons Sur la Langue Française (Léo Scheer, Paris).
2013 Pierre Guyotat : les grands entretiens d'Artpress (IMEC/Artpress, Paris).
2018 Idiotie (Grasset et Fasquelle, Paris).

Theatre 
1972 Bond en avant, produced by Marcel Bozonnet and Alain Ollivier
1987 Bivouac, produced by 
2005 Sur un cheval with Valérie Crunchant and  Mireille Perrier. Reading directed by Alain Ollivier for France Culture

Biography 
 2017 Pierre Guyotat Writings, drawings, recordings Cabinet Gallery, London, 29 March - 29 April
 2005 Pierre Guyotat: Essai biographique by Catherine Brun (Editions Leo Scheer).
 1995 Pierre Guyotat: Written Matter, Cabinet Gallery, London & Creation Books, 142 Charing Cross Road, 27 April - 27 May

References

External links 
Interview with Noura Wedell in Bomb Magazine
Video interview with Dominiq Jenvrey (subtitled in English) in ParisLike
Recordings of Guyotat reading his work (in French) hosted by UbuWeb.

1940 births
2020 deaths
20th-century French dramatists and playwrights
20th-century French novelists
21st-century French dramatists and playwrights
21st-century French novelists
French erotica writers
French male novelists
Obscenity controversies in literature
People from Loire (department)
Prix Décembre winners
Prix Médicis winners